David N. Miller Jr. (born ) is a United States Space Force major general who serves as the director of operations, training, and force development of the United States Space Command. Previously, he was as the Assistant Deputy Chief of Space Operations for Operations, Cyber and Nuclear and, prior to that, the senior military assistant to the United States Secretary of the Air Force. In April 2021, Miller was nominated for transfer to the United States Space Force and promotion to major general.

Education
 1993 Bachelor of Arts, Anthropology and Sociology, Lafayette College, Easton, Pa.
 1997 Squadron Officers School, Maxwell Air Force Base, Ala.
 1997 Master of Business Administration, with Honors, Regis University, Denver, Colo.
 2001 U.S. Air Force Weapons School, Academic Award and Best Paper Honors, Nellis AFB, Nev.
 2004 Air Command and Staff College, Maxwell AFB, Ala., by correspondence
 2005 Distinguished Graduate, Master of National Security and Strategic Studies, College of Naval Command and Staff, Naval War College, Newport, R.I.
 2006 Master of Airpower Arts and Science, School of Advanced Air and Space Studies, Maxwell AFB, Ala.
 2008 Air War College, Maxwell AFB, Ala., by correspondence
 2013 Distinguished Graduate, Master of Science, National Security Strategy, National War College, Fort Lesley J. McNair, Washington, D.C.
 2015 Leadership Development Program, Center for Creative Leadership, Greensboro, N.C.
 2016 Enterprise Perspective Seminar, Alan Freed Associates, Washington, D.C.
 2017 China and East Asia Seminar, Alan Freed Associates, Washington, D.C.
 2018 Continuous Process Improvement for Executives, Institute for Defense Business, Durham, N.C.
 2019 Euro-Zone/Mid-East-Asia Seminar, Alan Freed Associates, Washington, D.C.

Assignments

1. July 1993–May 1994, Gold Bar Recruiter, AFROTC Det 485, Rutgers University, New Brunswick, N.J.
2. May 1994–September 1994, Outstanding Performer, Undergraduate Missile Training, Vandenberg Air Force Base, Calif.
3. September 1994–September 1998, ICBM operator, Instructor and Senior Stan/Eval Crew Commander, 321st Missile Squadron and 90th Operations Group, F.E. Warren AFB, Wyo.
4. September 1998–May 2000, Weapons and Tactics Flight Commander, 2nd Space Warning Squadron, Buckley Air National Guard Base, Colo.
5. May 2000–June 2001, Executive Officer, 21st Operations Group, Peterson AFB, Colo.
6. July 2001–December 2001, Student, U.S. Air Force Weapons School Space Division, Nellis AFB, Nev.
7. December 2001–March 2002, Chief, Weapons and Tactics, 21st Operations Group, Peterson AFB, Colo.
8. March 2002–June 2005, Chief of Strategy Plans, Pacific Air Forces Air Operations Center and Legislative Liaison, PACAF Commander's Action Group, Hickam AFB, Hawaii
9. July 2005–June 2006, Student, College of Naval Command and Staff, Newport, R.I.
10. July 2006–June 2007, Student, School of Advanced Air and Space Studies, Maxwell AFB, Ala.
11. June 2007–June 2008, Chief, Space Control Division, HQ Air Force, the Pentagon, Arlington, Va.
12. June 2008–August 2009, Chief, Combat Operations Division, 614 AOC/Joint Space Operations Center, Vandenberg AFB, Calif.
13. September 2009–June 2011, Commander, 2nd Range Operations Squadron, Vandenberg AFB, Calif.
14. June 2011–July 2012, Military Assistant to the Under Secretary of the Air Force, the Pentagon, Arlington, Va.
15. July 2012–June 2013, Student, National War College, Fort Lesley J. McNair, Washington, D.C.
16. June 2013–June 2015, Commander, 21st Operations Group, Peterson AFB, Colo.
17. July 2015–August 2016, Senior Advisor to the PM's Office and MoI, U.S. Embassy, Baghdad, Iraq
18. August 2016–January 2018, Commander, 460th Space Wing, Buckley AFB, Colo.
19. January 2018–January 2020, Director, Plans, Programs and Financial Management, Headquarters, Air Force Space Command, and later, Headquarters, United States Space Force, Peterson AFB, Colo.
20. January 2020–January 2021, Senior Military Assistant to the Secretary of the Air Force, Dept. of the Air Force, the Pentagon, Arlington, Va.
21. February 2021–June 2021, Assistant Deputy Chief of Space Operations for Operations, Cyber and Nuclear, U.S. Space Force, the Pentagon, Arlington, Va.
22. June 2021–present, Director of Operations, Training and Force Development, U.S. Space Command, Schriever Space Force Base, Colo.

Awards and decorations
Miller is the recipient of the following awards:

Dates of promotion

References 

Living people
Year of birth missing (living people)
Place of birth missing (living people)
Lafayette College alumni
Regis University alumni
College of Naval Command and Staff alumni
School of Advanced Air and Space Studies alumni
National War College alumni
United States Air Force generals
Brigadier generals